High Spy is a fell in the English Lake District it is situated on the ridge that separates the Newlands Valley from Borrowdale, eight kilometres (five miles) south of Keswick.

Topography
It is a distinctive fell that has  of topographic prominence from the higher adjoining fell of Dale Head and so misses being a Marilyn by only two metres. Geologically the fell is made up of Borrowdale Volcanics. The meaning of the fell's name is obscure but may mean a “lookout post”, referring to some lost fort in the area. In the past it has been known as Scawdel Fell and Lobstone Band and these names are still used on maps to label other parts of the fell.

The summit has an impressive cairn which has been known to be vandalised on occasions but always seems to gets rebuilt by other walkers.

Ascents
High Spy is often climbed as part of the Newlands Horseshoe ridge walk but can be ascended directly despite being defended by crags on both its Newlands and Borrowdale sides. From Borrowdale a path goes from Rosthwaite and climbs through the disused Rigg Head Quarries to reach the col linking High Spy to Dale Head and then up the south ridge to the summit passing a small unnamed tarn just before the top. From this side it is also possible to start from Grange and use an old drove road to get through the barrier of Blea Crag and then approach the summit. A scrambling route also starts from Grange, going via Hollows Farm it tackles the rocky rake of Nitting Haws directly. From Little Town in the Newlands valley an old mine road zig zags up to the col between the fell and Dale Head to then reach the top by the south ridge.

Mining
The latter route passes the Castlenook lead mine at the foot of the fell on the Newlands side, this mine, formerly owned by the Company of Mines Royal, started production in the 1860s and continued until 1918 when cheaper imports led to its closure. There are also signs of trial levels higher up the steep slope.

References 

Hewitts of England
Fells of the Lake District
Nuttalls